The Philippine Carabao Center ( or Sentro ng Pilipinas para sa Kalabaw) an attached agency of the Department of Agriculture, was established at Science City of Muñoz in Nueva Ecija province in 1992 to breed and cross carabao based on high-yield Murrah buffalo (native breed of Haryana state of India) in the Philippines as a multi-purpose animal that can be raised for milk, meat, hide, and draft.

History 
It was set up in 1992 on a  piece of land donated by Central Luzon State University on its main campus, initially with 6 network centers in 1992. 7 more network centers were added in 1994 bringing the total to 13. It was sponsored as a bill by the then senator Joseph Estrada and eventually enacted as a law through Republic Act 7307 i.e. the Philippine Carabao Act of 1992.

Carabao's global, asian and filipino population 

As per the Food and Agriculture Organization of the United Nations (FAO), report, the global buffalo population was 148 million in 1992. Asia has 98% of the global buffalo population of nearly 194 million. In 2003, India had 98 million water buffalo (57% of world's buffalo population), followed by 23 million (12%  of world's buffalo population) in China, and 3.2 million (1.6%  of world's buffalo population) swamp-type carabao in the Philippines. Buffalo play an important part in India, China and Philippines's national and rural economy. The PCC was set up with the aims to enhance carabao breed.

Imported Breeds at PCC

To improve the breeds and milk yield, high milk yield Murrah buffalo breed were imported from the 
Central Institute for Research on Buffaloes, Hisar, India, a reputed species of the dairy type originating from Haryana state of India. Murrah breed are reputed as a high milk yield breed that can produce an average of more than eight liters of milk daily over a 300 days long annual productive cycle. Better performing Murrah buffalo can produce 12 to 15 liters per day on average, with top performers going up to 25 liters per day. PCC also imported Indian Murrah breed via third-party countries such Bulgaria, USA and Latin America. PCC breeds and cross-breeds Murrah buffalo through artificial insemination.

Reproduction Technology
The PCC had some success in reproductive biotechnology in 2004 when the first test-tube buffalo was born on April 5, also the birthday of President Gloria Macapagal-Arroyo. Incidentally, the test-tube buffalo is a female and was named as "Glory" after the President.

Milk Yield Improvement

Late in 2007, according to Filipino scientists, the Center located in Nueva Ecija initiated a study to breed the super water buffalo that could produce 4 to 18 liters of milk/day using gene-based technology. The majority of the funding came from the Department of Science and Technology. When this marker-assisted selection process is perfected it will allow the poor farmers to conserve their resources by raising only the best producers that are genetically selected soon after birth.

Network Centers 
PCC has 13 network centers at various host universities including the following:

 Luzon 
 Mariano Marcos State University (MMSU) at Batac city of Ilocos Norte. PCC was established in 1994.
 Cagayan State University (CSU) at Piat city of Cagayan. PCC was established in 1992.
 Don Mariano Marcos Memorial State University (DMMMSU) at Rosario city of La Union. PCC established in 1994. PCC was established in 1994.
 Central Luzon State University (CLSU) at Science City of Muñoz of Nueva Ecija. PCC was established in 1992.
 University of the Philippines Los Baños (UPLB) at Los Baños city of Laguna. PCC was established in 1992.
 Visayas
 Visayas State University (VSU) at Baybay city of Leyte. PCC was established in 1994.
 West Visayas State University (WVSU) at Calinog of Iloilo City. PCC was established in 1994.
 La Carlota Stock Farm (LCSF) at La Granja of La Carlota, Negros Occidental. PCC was established in 1992.
 Ubay Stock Farm (USF) at Ubay city of Bohol. PCC was established in 1992.
 Mindanao
 Mindanao Livestock Production Complex (MLPC) at Kalawit of Zamboanga del Norte. PCC was established in 1994. 
 Central Mindanao University (CMU) at University Town, Musuan city of Bukidnon. PCC was established in 1992.
 Mindanao State University (MSU) at Marawi City. PCC was established in 1994.
 University of Southern Mindanao (USM) at Kabacan of North Cotabato. PCC was established in 1994.

There is demand to set up at least additional 9 carabao network centres, 5 in Luzon, 1 in Visayas and 3 in Mindanao, at the following places:
 Luzon:
 Santiago, Isabela (Isabela State University, Santiago Campus)
 Olongapo
 Mindoro
 Puerto Princesa
 Naga, Camarines Sur
 Visayas
 Cebu
 Mindanao
 Butuan
 Tagum
 General Santos

International partners
Philippine Carabao Center runs an "International Buffalo Knowledge Resource Services" (IBKRS) in partnership with the following institutes:

 India
 Central Institute for Research on Buffaloes (CIRB) at Hisar in Haryana state
 National Bureau of Animal Genetic Resources (NDRI) at Kernal in Haryana state
 Taiwan
 Taiwan Livestock Research Institute
 Korea
 National Institute of Animal Science

Gallery

See also
 Murrah buffalo
 Central Institute for Research on Buffaloes, Hisar, India
 Government Livestock Farm, Hisar, India

References

External links

 Philippine Carabao Center, official website
 Buffalopedia, created by CIRB Hisar, India

Biological research institutes
Research institutes in the Philippines
Organizations established in 1992
Organizations based in Nueva Ecija
Muñoz, Nueva Ecija
Dairy farming in the Philippines